The third cycle of Holland's Next Top Model premiered on 15 October 2007 on RTL5. This was the first cycle of the series to be hosted by Dutch model Daphne Deckers, who replaced the previous host, Yfke Sturm after two cycles. All of the previous season's judges returned for the new cycle, with the exception of photographer and creative director Carli Hermès, who was replaced by photographer Philip Riches. Bastiaan van Schaik also replaced stylist Ruud van der Pijl as a mentor for the contestants.

The prizes for this cycle included a modelling contract with Modelmasters The Agency valued at €75,000, a cover feature for Glamour magazine an advertising campaign for L'Oreal, and the opportunity to represent the Netherlands at the 2008 Ford Models Supermodel of the World contest.

The winner of the competition was 20-year-old Cecile Sinclair from Middelburg, Zeeland.

Cast

Contestants
(Ages stated are at start of contest)

Judges
 Daphne Deckers (host)
Rosalie van Breemen
Philip Riches
Karin Swerink
Mariana Verkerk

Other cast members
Hildo Groen  
Bastiaan van Schaik

Episodes

Results

 The contestant was eliminated outside of judging panel
 The contestant was put through collectively to the next round
 The contestant quit the competition
 The contestant was eliminated
 The contestant won the competition

Final scores

Notes

References

External links
 Official website (archive at the Wayback Machine)

Holland's Next Top Model
2007 Dutch television seasons